Peter Armstrong may refer to:

 Peter Armstrong (journalist), Canadian journalist
 Peter Armstrong (poet) (born 1957), British poet
 Peter Armstrong (rugby league), Australian rugby league footballer
 Peter William Armstrong (born 1943), television and radio producer
 Peter Armstrong (priest) (1929–2009), priest for the 49'ers